Myrsine collina, synonym Rapanea collina, is a species of plant in the family Primulaceae. It is endemic to the Society Islands.

References

Flora of the Society Islands
collina
Taxonomy articles created by Polbot
Taxobox binomials not recognized by IUCN